List of leaders of Inner Mongolia.

List of Chinese Communist Party secretaries 
 Ulanhu (乌兰夫): 1947–1966
 Xie Xuegong (解学恭): 1966–1967
 Teng Haiqing (滕海清): 1968–1969
 Zheng Weishan (郑维山): 1969–1971
 You Taizhong (尤太忠): 1971–1978 
 Zhou Hui (周惠): 1978–1986
 Zhang Shuguang (张曙光): 1986–1987 
 Wang Qun (王群): 1987–1994 
 Liu Mingzu (刘明祖): 1994–2001 
 Chu Bo (储波): 2001–2009
 Hu Chunhua (胡春华): 2009–2012
 Wang Jun: 2012–2016
 Li Jiheng: 2016–2019
 Shi Taifeng: 2019–2022
 Sun Shaocheng: 2022-present

List of chairmen of government
Ulanhu (乌兰夫): 1947–1966 
Teng Haiqing (滕海清): 1967–1971
You Taizhong (尤太忠): 1971–1978 
Kong Fei (孔飞): 1978–1982
Buhe (布赫): 1982–1993 
Uliji (乌力吉): 1993–1998 
Yun Bulong (云布龙): 1998–2000 
Uyunqimg (乌云其木格): 2000–2003 
Yang Jing (杨晶): 2003–2008
Bagatur (巴特尔): 2008–2016
Bu Xiaolin: 2016–2021
Wang Lixia: 2021–present 

Inner Mongolia
Inner Mongolia
Indigenous politics